Damon O'Keith Gibson is a former professional football player of the National Football League. He played four years in the league: 1998 with the Cincinnati Bengals, 1999 with the Cleveland Browns, 2001 with the Jacksonville Jaguars, and the 2002 season with both Jacksonville Jaguars & Atlanta Falcons.  He was released by the Jaguars two days after he fumbled a punt return that led to the Indianapolis Colts winning by 3 points. He played for the Los Angeles Xtreme in the XFL in 2001.

He was used primarily on special teams, as he had a 65-yard touchdown return in his first game for the Bengals. He had 218 punt return yards on 27 returns in his rookie year.

References

External links

1975 births
Living people
American football return specialists
American football wide receivers
Cincinnati Bengals players
Jacksonville Jaguars players
Los Angeles Xtreme players
Iowa Hawkeyes football players
People from Houston
Forest Brook High School alumni
Atlanta Falcons players